The Academy of National Defense Science, formerly Second Academy of Natural Sciences, is a North Korean organization involved in the North Korean missile program, including the Hwasong-14. It is based in Pyongyang, and currently headed by Colonel General Jang Chang-ha.

It has been sanctioned by the United States government, and subject to export controls in relations to United Nations Security Council Resolution 2270.

History
In 2010, it was known as the Second Academy of Natural Sciences.

Naval warfare

The Academy is also responsible for developing naval vessels and weapons, and has a Maritime Research Institute, headquartered at the Sinpo South Shipyard.

The Academy also operates the Namp’o Ship Design Institute.

Leaders
 Jang Chang-ha (current)
 Choe Chun-sik (c. 2012)

See also
 Academy of Sciences of the Democratic People's Republic of Korea

References

Education in Pyongyang
Educational organizations based in North Korea
Military education and training in North Korea